Chattahoochee may refer to:

Places 
Chattahoochee River, a river in Georgia, Alabama, and Florida
Chattahoochee, Florida, a town in Gadsden County, Florida
Chattahoochee County, Georgia, a county that contains part of Ft. Benning
Chattahoochee Plantation, Georgia, a community in Cobb County, Georgia
Chattahoochee National Forest, part of the Chattahoochee-Oconee National Forest in northern Georgia
Whittier Mill Village, a neighborhood of Atlanta whose original name was Chattahoochee

Entertainment 
Chattahoochee (film), a 1989 film starring Gary Oldman and Dennis Hopper set at the Florida State Hospital
"Chattahoochee" (song), a 1993 song by Alan Jackson named for the Chattahoochee River
"Chattahoochee" (song), a 2013 song by Dimitri Vegas & Like Mike for the Tomorrowland 2013 Anthem
"Chattahoochee", a song by 38 Special on their album  Rock & Roll Strategy, named for the Florida State Hospital

Other 
Chattahoochee, a metonym for the Florida State Hospital located in Chattahoochee, Florida
Chattahoochee High School, a high school in Johns Creek, Georgia